Brandon Marsh may refer to:
 Brandon Marsh (baseball), American professional baseball outfielder
 Brandon Marsh nature reserve, nature reserve located in England